Queen's Way is a 1.8 km long picturesque walkway in the city of Kochi, Kerala, India. It is a fully automated musical walkway that stretches from the start of GIDA road to Chathyath Church and is a popular hangout place for the locals. The walkway is situated at around 1.5 km from the High Court Junction and 2 km from Marine Drive. It was setup at an initial cost of  allowed by the Tourism Department.

Name 
Kochi is popularly known as Queen of the Arabian Sea. Winding its way alongside the serene backwaters, the walkway was named Queen's Way, which reflected the novelty in the nickname for the city.

Facilities 
The walkway is fully automated with smart phone-controlled lights. Around 120 benches are erected along the entire stretch of the road for the visitors to relax. An amphitheatre with a seating capacity for 50, lights to beautify trees and LED strips are some of the highlights of the walkway. The walkway is under the surveillance of 21 bullet CCTV cameras and three advanced 360-degree cameras. There are frequent cleaning campaigns undertaken along the protected mangrove forests that line the walkway and adjoining areas in Pachalam and Vaduthala.

References

See also
 Marine Drive

Pedestrian infrastructure in India
Transport in Kochi